Voake is a surname. Notable people with the surname include:

Charlotte Voake (born 1957), Welsh children's book illustrator 
Erik Voake (born 1973), American filmmaker and photographer
Steve Voake, English children's author

See also
Volke

Surnames of British Isles origin